Ronald Young (born July 22, 1970) is an American professional stock car racing driver who raced part-time in the NASCAR Nationwide Series from 1999 to 2008, mostly in his family team's No. 71 Chevrolet. He also competed in the NASCAR Southeast Series for a decade where he won six races and finished as high as third in points. Additionally, in 2007, Young drove in an ARCA Re/Max Series race at Nashville, his one and only start in that series.

The only year that Young did not make any Busch Series starts was in 2004, which was because his hauler was stolen just before the start of the season. They had planned to run 15 races beginning at Rockingham, but ended up running none at all before returning in 2005.

Motorsports career results

NASCAR
(key) (Bold – Pole position awarded by qualifying time. Italics – Pole position earned by points standings or practice time. * – Most laps led.)

Nationwide Series

ARCA Re/Max Series
(key) (Bold – Pole position awarded by qualifying time. Italics – Pole position earned by points standings or practice time. * – Most laps led.)

References

External links
 

1970 births
Living people
People from Conyers, Georgia
Sportspeople from the Atlanta metropolitan area
Racing drivers from Georgia (U.S. state)
NASCAR drivers
ARCA Menards Series drivers